Víctor Milciades Morel Bavera (born 9 September 1953) is a Paraguayan former football striker.

Career
Morel spent two seasons playing for RCD Espanyol, notably scoring the goal in a 0–1 victory at Hércules which confirmed Espanyol's safety from relegation during the 1979–80 season.

Honours

Club
 Libertad
 Paraguayan Primera División: 1976

National team
 Copa América: 1979

References

External links
 
 
 

1953 births
Living people
Paraguayan footballers
Paraguay international footballers
Copa América-winning players
1979 Copa América players
Club Libertad footballers
RCD Espanyol footballers
Sportivo Luqueño players
Club Guaraní players
Cerro Porteño players
Association football forwards